T.O. Sylvester was a comic strip featured in the San Francisco Chronicle from 1983 to 1999. "T.O. Sylvester" was also the shared pseudonym of the strip's creative team, Sylvia Mollick and Terry Ryan. Sylvester's work was included in Gay Comix #5 and #6 and Meatmen.

External links
 Guide to the Lesbian, Gay, Bisexual, Transgender (LGBT) Collection at the Smithsonian Institution National Museum of American History Archives Center

References

American comics
1983 comics debuts
1999 comics endings
LGBT-related comics
Sylvester, T. O.
Sylvester, T. O.
Sylvester, T. O.
Sylvester, T. O.
20th-century pseudonymous writers